Glycoalkaloids are a family of chemical compounds derived from alkaloids to which sugar groups are appended.  Several are potentially toxic, most notably the poisons commonly found in the plant species Solanum dulcamara (bittersweet nightshade) and other plants in the genus Solanum, including potato.

A prototypical glycoalkaloid is solanine (composed of the sugar solanose and the alkaloid solanidine), which is found in the potato. The alkaloidal portion of the glycoalkaloid is also generically referred to as an aglycone. The intact glycoalkaloid is poorly absorbed from the gastrointestinal tract, therefore causing gastrointestinal irritation. The aglycone is absorbed and is believed to be responsible for observed nervous system signs.

Glycoalkaloids are typically bitter tasting, and produce a burning irritation in the back of the mouth and side of the tongue. The Aymara people of Bolivia use taste to detect the levels of glycoalkaloids in potatoes to determine the safety of various cultigens.

Although not routinely available, detection of alkaloids in tissues or urine is possible for laboratory diagnosis of exposure.

Sale of a glycoalkaloid-based treatment marketed by Lane Labs USA Inc. for prevention of skin cancer was banned by the FDA in 2004 as an unapproved drug.

References

External links

 
Alkaloids found in Solanaceae